The Mosque of Amr ibn al-As, or Taj al-Jawame', or Masjid Ahl ar-Rayah, or  Jame’ al-Ateeq, was originally built in 641–642 AD, as the center of the newly founded capital of Egypt, Fustat. The original structure was the first mosque ever built in Egypt and the whole of Africa. For 600 years, the mosque was also an important center of Islamic learning until Al-Muizz's Al-Azhar Mosque in Islamic Cairo replaced it. Through the twentieth century, it was the fourth largest mosque in the Islamic world.

The location for the mosque was the site of the tent of the commander of the Muslim army, general Amr ibn al-As. One corner of the mosque contains the tomb of his son, 'Abd Allah ibn 'Amr ibn al-'As. Due to extensive reconstruction over the centuries nothing of the original building remains, but the rebuilt Mosque is a prominent landmark and can be seen in what today is known as Old Cairo. It is an active mosque with a devout congregation, and when prayers are not taking place, it is also open to visitors and tourists.

Location

According to tradition, the original location was chosen by a bird.  Amr ibn al-As, by order of Caliph Umar, was the Arab general that conquered Egypt from the Romans.  In 641, before he and his army attacked their capital city of Alexandria (at the northwestern part of the Nile river delta), Amr had set up his tent on the eastern side of the Nile, at the southern part of the delta.  As the story is told, shortly before Amr set off to battle, a dove laid an egg in his tent.  When Amr returned victorious, he needed to choose a site for a new capital city, since Umar had decreed that it could not be in far-away Alexandria. So Amr declared the site of the dove's egg to be the center of his new city, Fustat, or Misr al-Fustat, "City of the Tents".  Later, the Mosque of Amr was built on the same location.

Structure

The original layout was a simple rectangle, 29 meters in length by 17 meters wide.  It was a low shed with columns made from split palm tree trunks, stones and mud bricks, covered by a roof of wood and palm leaves. The floor was of gravel. Inside the building the orientation toward Mecca was not noted by a concave niche like it would be in all later mosques. Instead four columns were used to point out the direction of mecca, and were inserted on the qibla wall. It was large enough to provide prayer space for Amr's army, but had no other adornments, and no minarets.

It was completely rebuilt in 673 by the governor Maslama ibn Mukhallad al-Ansari, who added four minarets, one at each of the mosque's corners, and doubled its area in size. The addition of these minarets allowed the call to prayer to be heard from every corner, and taken up by other nearby mosques. Governor Abd al-Aziz ibn Marwan added an extension to the mosque in 698 and once again doubled the mosque's area. In 711 a concave prayer niche was added to replace the flat one. In 827, it had seven new aisles built, parallel to the wall of the qibla, the direction that Muslims were to face during prayer.  Each aisle had an arcade of columns, with the last column in each row attached to the wall by means of a wooden architrave carved with a frieze.

In 827, governor Abd Allah ibn Tahir made more additions to the mosque. It was enlarged to its present size, and the southern wall of the present day mosque was built.

In the 9th century, the mosque was extended by the Abbasid Caliph al-Mamun, who added a new area on the southwest side, increasing the mosque's dimensions to 120m x 112m.

At a point during the Fatimid era, the mosque had five minarets. There were four, with one at each corner, and one at the entrance. However, all five are now gone. The current Minarets were built by Mourad Bey in 1800. Also, the Fatimid Caliph al-Mustansir added a silver belt to the prayer niche which was eventually removed by Saladin when the mosque was restored after the fire in Fustat.

In 1169, the city of Fustat and the mosque were destroyed by a fire that was ordered by Egypt's own vizier Shawar, who had ordered its destruction to prevent the city from being captured by the Crusaders. After the Crusaders were expelled, and the area had been conquered by Nur al-Din's army, Saladin took power, and had the mosque rebuilt in 1179. During this time Saladin had a belvedere built below a minaret.

In the 14th, century Burhan al-Din Ibrahim al-Mahalli paid the costs of restoring the mosque. In 1303, Emir Salar restored the mosque after an earthquake. He also added a stucco prayer niche for the outer wall of the mosque, which is now gone.

In the 18th century one of the Egyptian Mamluk leaders, Mourad Bey, destroyed the mosque because of dilapidation then ordered the rebuilding of it in 1796, before the arrival of Napoleon's French Expedition to Egypt. During Mourad's reconstruction, the builders decreased the number of rows of columns from seven to six, and changed the orientation of the aisles to make them perpendicular to the qibla wall.  It was also probably at this time that the current remaining minarets were added.  Unfortunately, during the French occupation much of the interior wood decoration was taken for firewood by the French Army.
 
In 1875, the mosque was again rebuilt. In the 20th century, during the reign of Egypt's Abbas Helmi II, the mosque underwent another restoration. Parts of the entrance were reconstructed in the 1980s.

The only part of the mosque's older structure which can still be seen are some of the architraves, which can be viewed along the southern wall of the Mosque. These were probably added during reconstruction in 827.

Notes and references

See also
 Lists of mosques
 List of mosques in Africa
 List of mosques in Egypt

Sources
 Behrens-Abouseif. Doris. 1989. Islamic Architecture in Cairo. Leiden: E. J. Brill.
 Creswell, K.A.C. 1940. Early Muslim Architecture, vol. II. Oxford University Press. Reprinted by Hacker Art Books, New York, 1979.

External links

 http://www.mosquee-amr.com
 https://web.archive.org/web/20050428140014/http://archnet.org/library/sites/one-site.tcl?site_id=2056
 http://www.ask-aladdin.com/amromosque.html
 http://www.islamicarchitecture.org/architecture/amrbinalas.html

7th-century mosques
18th-century mosques
Mosques completed in 1796
19th-century mosques
Mosques completed in 1875
Amr ibn al-As
Old Cairo
Mosque buildings with domes
Landmarks in Egypt
Muslim conquest of Egypt
Mosques completed in 641
Grand mosques
19th-century religious buildings and structures in Egypt
18th-century religious buildings and structures in Egypt